Kunimi may refer to:
 Kunimi, Fukushima, a town in Date District, Fukushima, Japan
 Kunimi, Nagasaki, a former town in Minamitakaki District, Nagasaki, Japan
 Kunimi, Ōita,  a former town in Higashikunisaki District, Ōita, Japan
 Kunimi (practice), the practice of climbing a mountain to survey the land
 Mount Kunimi, a mountain on the border of Isehara, Hadano and Atsugi in Kanagawa Prefecture, Japan
 Mount Kunimi (Daikō), a mountain on the border of Higashiyoshino, Nara, and Matsusaka, Mie, Japan